Józef Bronisław Tracz (born 1 September 1964 in Żary) is a Polish wrestler (Greco-Roman style) who has won three Olympic medals.

For his sport achievements, he received: 
 Knight's Cross of the Order of Polonia Restituta (5th Class) in 1996.

References

sports123.com

1964 births
Living people
People from Żary
Olympic silver medalists for Poland
Olympic bronze medalists for Poland
Olympic wrestlers of Poland
Wrestlers at the 1988 Summer Olympics
Wrestlers at the 1992 Summer Olympics
Wrestlers at the 1996 Summer Olympics
Polish male sport wrestlers
Olympic medalists in wrestling
Sportspeople from Lubusz Voivodeship
Medalists at the 1996 Summer Olympics
Medalists at the 1992 Summer Olympics
Medalists at the 1988 Summer Olympics
World Wrestling Championships medalists
20th-century Polish people
21st-century Polish people